4043 aluminium alloy is a wrought aluminium alloy with good corrosion resistance typically used as filler material for welding of aluminium parts. It contains high amounts of silicon (between 4.5 and 6%) and trace amounts of other metals. It is grey in appearance and is sold as either welding wire or welding rod for TIG/MIG processes.

Chemical composition 
Aluminium is the remainder.

References

Aluminium alloy table 

Aluminium–silicon alloys